Sergiy Stakhovsky and Mikhail Youzhny were the defending champions, but chose not to compete due to Youzhny's injured left foot.
The first seeded Rohan Bopanna and Aisam-ul-Haq Qureshi defeated the unseeded pair Robin Haase and Milos Raonic with a score of 7–6(10–8), 3–6, [11–9].

Seeds

Draw

Draw

External links
 ATP main draw
 ATP doubles results

Doubles